"Healing Hands" is a pop song by Australian singer Conrad Sewell. It was released to radio on 18 May 2018 as the lead single from Sewell's second extended play, Ghosts & Heartaches. The song has peaked at number seven on the Australian ARIA Singles Chart.

Sewell performed "Healing Hands" on The Voice Australia on 10 June 2018.

At the ARIA Music Awards of 2018, the song was nominated for Song of the Year.

At the APRA Music Awards of 2019, the song was nominated for Pop Work of the Year.

Music video
The music video for "Healing Hands" was directed by Tyler Dunning Evans and released on 28 June 2018.

Charts

Weekly charts

Year-end charts

Certifications

Release history

References 
 

2018 singles
Conrad Sewell songs
2018 songs
Sony Music Australia singles
Songs written by Conrad Sewell
Songs written by Wrabel
Songs written by Stuart Crichton